Catharina Hesterman (17 September 1902 – 17 July 1982) was a Dutch diver. She competed in the women's 3 metre springboard event at the 1928 Summer Olympics.

References

External links
 

1902 births
1982 deaths
Dutch female divers
Olympic divers of the Netherlands
Divers at the 1928 Summer Olympics
Divers from Amsterdam